Intiornis (meaning "Inti bird", the binominal naming means "Unexpected Sun bird") is an extinct genus of avisaurid enantiornithean birds which existed in what is now North-West Argentina during the late Cretaceous period (Campanian age).

Description 
The genus is known from a partial hind limb found in beds of the Upper Cretaceous Las Curtiembres Formation. Three primary toes on a limb of Intiornis are nearly the same length. It was named by Fernando Emilio Novas, Federico Lisandro Agnolín and Carlos Agustín Scanferla in 2010, and the type species is Intiornis inexpectatus. With the body length of around  Intiornis was the size of a sparrow, thus representing the smallest enantiornithes known from South America. Its closest relative was Soroavisaurus from the Lecho Formation (Maastrichtian age) of northwestern Argentina.

Phylogeny 
The cladogram below is from Wang et al., 2022:

Key to letters:

b = Boluochia
c = Cathayornis
e = Enantiophoenix
f = Houornis
h = Longipteryx
i = Parabohaiornis
j = Pterygornis
l = Vorona
m = Yuanjiawaornis
n = Yungavolucris

Paleobiology 
Long toes of equal length and large curved claws suggest adaptability for perching.

References 

Avisaurids
Campanian life
Cretaceous birds of South America
Late Cretaceous animals of South America
Cretaceous Argentina
Fossils of Argentina
Fossil taxa described in 2010